WLMM may refer to:

 Windows Live Movie Maker
 WLMM-LP, a defunct low-power radio station (103.9 FM) that was licensed to Channahon, Illinois, United States